Francisco Sagarzazu Badiola (born 31 January 1940), better known as Paco Sagarzazu, is a Spanish actor. He appeared in more than sixty films since 1981.

Selected filmography

References

External links 

1940 births
Living people
Spanish male film actors
20th-century Spanish male actors
21st-century Spanish male actors
People from San Sebastián
Male actors from the Basque Country (autonomous community)